Anisodontosaurus is an extinct genus of trilophosaurid allokotosaur known from the Middle Triassic Moenkopi Formation of Arizona. The type species, A. greeri, was named and described by Samuel Paul Welles in 1947, and its taxonomic placement was largely unknown (placed within the Eosuchia by Welles in 1947) until the holotype was reassessed in 1988, when it was recovered as a lepidosauromorph or a trilophosaurid. The holotype, a jaw catalogued as UCMP V3922, was discovered in 1940 and was described seven years later. Apart from the type specimen, Anisodontosaurus is known from the referred specimen UCMP 37815, a right ilium.

References 

Middle Triassic reptiles of North America
Allokotosaurs
Prehistoric reptile genera